Julian Knowle and Igor Zelenay were the defending champions but only Zelenay chose to defend his title, partnering Denys Molchanov. Zelenay lost in the semifinals to Ariel Behar and Máximo González.

Julian Ocleppo and Andrea Vavassori won the title after defeating Behar and González 7–6(7–5), 7–6(7–3) in the final.

Seeds

Draw

External Links
 Main Draw

Internazionali di Tennis d'Abruzzo - Doubles
Internazionali di Tennis d'Abruzzo